Cavite State University- Cavite City Campus (CvSU-CCC), formerly known as Cavite State University- Cavite Viejo Campus, is a satellite campus of Cavite State University, a state university in the province of Cavite in the Philippines. It is located beside Manila-Cavite Road (National Road 62) in Barangay 8, Pulo II, Dalahican, Cavite City. Established in 2001, it is one of eleven campuses of the university.

Notable alumni 

 Efren Penaflorida

References

Universities and colleges in Cavite
Education in Cavite City